Listed buildings in Chester are listed in the following articles:

Grade I listed buildings in Cheshire West and Chester
Grade II* listed buildings in Cheshire West and Chester
Grade II listed buildings in Chester (central)
Grade II listed buildings in Chester (east)
Grade II listed buildings in Chester (north and west)
Grade II listed buildings in Chester (south)
Listed buildings in Chester Castle parish